Eriorhynchus australicus is a species in the genus Eriorhynchus

References

Animals described in 1997
Trombidiformes